Robert McGregor or MacGregor may refer to:

 Robert Roy MacGregor (1671–1734), Scottish folk hero and outlaw
 Robert MacGregor (engineer) (1873–1956), British engineer
 Robert McGregor (Australian politician) (1853–1931), English-born Australian politician
 Robert MacGregor (Australian politician) (1825–1883), Scottish-born Australian headmaster and politician
 Robert McGregor (pentathlete) (born 1972), Australian modern pentathlete
 Bob McGregor (born 1944), Scottish swimmer
 Robert Henry McGregor (1886–1965), Canadian parliamentarian
 Robert McGregor (painter) (1847–1922), Scottish painter
 Robert M. McGregor (1876–1924), wholesale grocer, lumber merchant and political figure in Nova Scotia, Canada
 Rob Roy McGregor (admiral) (1907-2000), US Navy Rear Admiral, World War II Submarine Commander

See also
 John MacGregor (sportsman), nicknamed Rob Roy, British explorer and pioneer of recreational and sport canoeing